Datamost was a computer book publisher and computer game company founded by David Gordon and based in Chatsworth, California. Datamost operated in the early 1980s producing games and other software mainly for the Apple II, Commodore 64 and Atari 8-bit family, with some for the IBM PC. It also published educational and reference materials related to computers and computer programming.

Software

Publications
 How to Program the Apple II Using 6502 Assembly Language (1981) Using 6502 Assembly Language by Randy Hyde | PDF by Randy Hyde
 The Elementary Commodore-64 (1982) by William B. Sanders, Ph.D.
 How to Write an Apple Program (1982) by Ed Faulk
 Designing Apple Games with Pizazz (1983) by Greg Minter and John Ruffner
 p-Source (A Guide to the Apple Pascal System) (1983) by Randall Hyde
 Games Apples Play (1983) by Mark James Capella and Michael D. Weinstock
 Games Ataris Play (1983) by Hal Glicksman and Kent Simon
 Games Commodores Play (1983) by Phil Dennis and Greg Minter
 The Elementary Apple (1983) by William B. Sanders
 The Commodore 64 Experience (1983) by Mike Dean Klein
 The Atari Experience by Adrien Z. Lamothe (1984)
 Atari Roots (1984) by Mark Andrews
 The Musical Atari (1984) by Hal Glickman
 The Apple Almanac (1984) by Eric Goez and William Sanders
 Apple Macintosh Primer (1984) by William Sanders
 Inside Commodore DOS (1984, 1985) by Richard Immers and Gerald G. Neufeld
 The Super Computer Snooper (1984) by Isaac Malitz

References

External links

Defunct software companies of the United States
Defunct video game companies of the United States
Defunct companies based in Greater Los Angeles
Video game companies established in 1981